A series of major earthquakes struck Central Italy between the Marche and Umbria regions in October 2016. The third quake on 30 October was the largest in Italy in 36 years, since the 1980 Irpinia earthquake.

Earthquakes 
The earthquake was also felt in the city of Rome. In the region of Marche some houses collapsed, Italian media reported. There were also power failures and the telephone lines were interrupted.

The civil protection, however, estimated the consequences less dramatically than feared. According to official data, a man died because he had suffered a heart attack as a result of the quake.

Early news and social media reports showed heavy damage to some structures. The village of Arquata del Tronto was destroyed, as were several heritage buildings. These include the Basilica of Saint Benedict in Norcia, the Church of San Salvatore and other churches in Campi. Two women died of sudden heart attacks during the quake.

Shocks

Geological aspects  
The quakes occurred in a seismic gap which is located between the areas hit by the 2016 August earthquake and the one in Umbria and Marche of 1997. In that gap no strong earthquake happened for more than 100 years until 2016.

As the process of faulting along the chain of the Apennine Mountains is a relatively recent one in geological terms, starting 500,000 years ago, the faults are more irregular, so more shaking occurs due to foreshocks according to seismologist Ross Stein from Stanford University. In this case the destructive shock on 26 October was preceded by the foreshock by two hours, causing people to leave their homes and be safer when the larger shock occurred.

Comparisons with August 2016 earthquake

See also
 August 2016 Central Italy earthquake
 January 2017 Central Italy earthquakes
 List of earthquakes in Italy
 List of earthquakes in 2016

References

External links
 Earthquake in Italy on Earthquake Report Website
 EMSR190: Earthquake in Central Italy (damage grading maps) – Copernicus Emergency Management Service

2016 earthquakes
2016 in Italy
2016 disasters in Italy
Earthquakes in Italy
History of le Marche
October 2016 events in Italy
Earthquake clusters, swarms, and sequences
History of Umbria